Strophalosiidina is a suborder of Brachiopod containing the families:

 Superfamily Strophalosioidea
 Family Strophalosiidae
 Family Chonopectidae
 Family Araksalosiidae
 Superfamily Aulostegoidea
 Family Aulostegidae
 Family Cooperinidae
 Family Scacchinellidae
 Superfamily Richthofenioidea
 Family Richthofeniidae
 Family Hercosiidae
 Family Cyclacanthariidae
 Family Gemmellaroiidae

References

Strophomenata